The Australian property market comprises the trade of land and its permanent fixtures located within Australia. The average Australian property price grew 0.5% per year from 1890 to 1990 after inflation, however rose from 1990 to 2017 at a faster rate and may be showing signs of a contracting economic bubble. House prices in Australia receive considerable attention from the media and the Reserve Bank and some commentators have argued that there is an Australian property bubble. 

The residential housing market has seen drastic changes in prices in the past few decades. The property prices are soaring in major cities like Sydney, Melbourne, Adelaide, Perth, Brisbane and Hobart. The median house price in Sydney peaked at $780,000 in 2016.  However, with stricter credit policy and reduced interest from foreign investors in residential property, prices have started falling in all the major cities.  When compared with the soaring prices of 2017, the housing prices fell by 11.1% in Sydney and 7.2% in Melbourne in 2018.  In 2022 the residential rental market has seen a significant increase in rents, which has been described as a ‘rental crisis’.

Description

Composition 

In 2011 there were 8.6m households with an average household size of 2.6 persons per household. Freestanding houses have historically comprised most building approvals, but recent data shows a trend towards higher density housing such as townhouses and units. Turnover rates vary across market cycles, but typically average 6% per year. Since 1999-2000 the proportion of households renting from state/territory housing authorities has declined from 6% to 3%  while the proportion renting privately increased from 20% to 26% in 2019-20.

Regional variations 

The Australian property market is non-uniform, with high variation observed across the major cities and regional areas.

Sydney 

In Sydney, as of March 2010, the Property Market's vacancy rate reached 0.53% signalling that the market is recovering, as these rates had reached 2% in August 2009. As of July 2015, the Property Market in Sydney has surged in the first Q of 2015, up 3.1%. Sydney's eastern and northern suburbs typically attract the highest prices.

Key issues

Affordability 

In the late 2000s, housing prices in Australia, relative to average incomes, were among the highest in the world. As at 2011, house prices were on average six times average household income, compared to four times in 1990. This prompted speculation that the country was experiencing a real estate bubble, like many other countries.

Foreign investment has also been identified as a key driver of affordability issues, with recent years seeing particularly high capital inflows from Chinese investors.

Immigration to Australia
A number of economists, such as Macquarie Bank analyst Rory Robertson, assert that high immigration and the propensity of new arrivals to cluster in the capital cities is exacerbating the nation's housing affordability problem.  According to Robertson, Federal Government policies that fuel demand for housing, such as the currently high levels of immigration, as well as capital gains tax discounts and subsidies to boost fertility, have had a greater impact on housing affordability than land release on urban fringes.

The Productivity Commission Inquiry Report No. 28 First Home Ownership (2004) also stated, in relation to housing, "that Growth in immigration since the mid-1990s has been an important contributor to underlying demand, particularly in Sydney and Melbourne." This has been exacerbated by Australian lenders relaxing credit guidelines for temporary residents, allowing them to buy a home with a 10 percent deposit.

The RBA in its submission to the same PC Report also stated "rapid growth in overseas visitors such as students may have boosted demand for rental housing". However, in question in the report was the statistical coverage of resident population. The "ABS population growth figures omit certain household formation groups – namely, overseas students and business migrants who do not continuously stay for 12 months in Australia." This statistical omission lead to the admission: "The Commission recognises that the ABS resident population estimates have limitations when used for assessing housing demand. Given the significant influx of foreigners coming to work or study in Australia in recent years, it seems highly likely that short-stay visitor movements may have added to the demand for housing. However, the Commissions are unaware of any research that quantifies the effects."

Some individuals and interest groups have also argued that immigration causes overburdened infrastructure.

Foreign investment in residential property
In December 2008, the federal government introduced legislation relaxing rules for foreign buyers of Australian property. According to FIRB (Foreign Investment Review Board) data released in August 2009, foreign investment in Australian real estate had increased by more than 30% year to date. One agent said that "overseas investors buy them to land bank, not to rent them out. The houses just sit vacant because they are after capital growth."

Negative gearing 

Australian property investors often apply the practice of negative gearing. This occurs when the investor borrows money to fund the purchase of the property, and the income generated by the property is less than the cost of owning and managing the property including interest. The investor is expecting that capital gains will compensate for the shortfall. Negative gearing receives considerable media and political attention due to the perceived distortion it creates on residential property prices. In anticipation of labor being elected in the 2019 federal election, the banks issued less interest only loans which are used by many investors for negative gearing.

Residential rental market 

In 2022 the Australian residential rental market saw an annual increase in rents of 12%, the strongest increase in 14 years. Across Australia the vacancy rate was 1%, when a rate below 2% is considered very competitive with affordability constraints impacting tenants. A number of sources have described the situation as a ‘rental crisis’.

The primary reason for the rental crisis is a lack of supply due to a variety of reasons, including existing landlords selling their rental properties which are being purchased by owner-occupiers and some landlords using their properties on the short term rental market such as Airbnb. Other commenators cited a lack of social housing being provided by the government. The COVID-19 pandemic also impacted the rental market with shared households reducing in size and city workers moving to regional areas due to increased remote work.

See also
Australian property bubble
Home ownership in Australia
Housing in Victoria

References

Real estate in Australia
Economy of Australia
Housing in Australia
Real estate bubbles of the 2000s